Anthony Leopold Raymond Peiris (9 August 1932 – 29 September 2017) was a Roman Catholic bishop.

Ordained to the priesthood in 1958, Peiris served as bishop of the Roman Catholic Diocese of Kurunegala, Sri Lanka, from 1987 until 2009.

See also
Catholic Church in Sri Lanka

Notes

1932 births
2017 deaths
21st-century Roman Catholic bishops in Sri Lanka
20th-century Roman Catholic bishops in Sri Lanka
People from Kurunegala